"Altyn Ay" Medal (Golden Moon) is a medal of Hero of Turkmenistan, a special decoration of a Hero of Turkmenistan.

Description of the medal

1992-2014 
The Altyn Ay medal has the shape of a circle inscribed in a regular octagonal star formed by the angles of two squares (small and large) displaced relative to each other. The star is made of white gold and consists of 48 rays, decorated with 124 diamonds of various sizes. The total diameter of the medal is 44 millimetres. In the center of the medal, made of 958 gold, against the background of 17 sun rays coming from the center, there is a relief profile of President Saparmurat Niyazov made of white gold.

Since 2014 
In 2014, a new version of the description of the medal was approved. The medal has the shape of a circle inscribed in a regular octagonal star formed by the angles of two squares displaced relative to each other. The star is made of gold and consists of 48 sun rays, decorated with 128 diamonds of various sizes. The total diameter of the medal is 60 millimetres. The medal is made of 750 standard gold.

Awardees 

 Gurbanguly Berdimuhamedov

 Maya Kuliyeva
 Oleg Kononenko

References 

Orders, decorations, and medals of Turkmenistan